

Events
February 18 – To celebrate the opening of the parliament of the new Italian nation at Turin, Giuseppe Verdi's opera La Favorita is performed in the Teatro Regio.  Verdi himself is a deputy in the new parliament.
March 13 – Tannhäuser scandal in Paris.
November – Nikolai Rimsky-Korsakov is introduced by his teacher Feodor A. Kanille to Mily Balakirev. This completes the Russian Five. He begins his Symphony in E flat under Balakirev's guidance. 
Tchaikovsky starts to attend RMS classes in music theory taught by Nikolai Zaremba at the Mikhailovsky Palace

Published popular music

 "Abide With Me", w. Rev Henry Francis Lyte m. William Henry Monk (Words 1847)
 "Alice, Where Art Thou?", w. Wellington Guernsey m. Joseph Ascher
 "Aura Lea", w. W. W. Fosdick m. George R. Poulton
 "The Bonnie Blue Flag", w. Mrs Annie Chambers Ketchum m. Harry Macarthy
 "Eternal Father, Strong to Save", w. William Whiting m. Rev. John Bacchus Dykes
 "Go Down, Moses", trad spiritual
 "Holy! Holy! Holy! Lord God Almighty", w. Reginald Heber m. John Bacchus Dykes
 "I'm Going Home to Dixie", w. Dan Emmett arr. C. S. Grafully
 "John Brown's Body", w. anon m. William Steffe
 "Maryland, My Maryland", w. James Ryder Randall m. Walter de Mapers (Music "Mini est Propositum" 12th century)
 "The Privateer", w.m. anon ("Quien Sabé")
 "The Vacant Chair", w. Henry S. Washburn m. George Frederick Root

Classical music
Peter Benoit 
Fantaisie No.4, Op.20
Piano Sonata, Op.34, premiered March 21 by Angèle Tailhardat
Hoogmis, premiered July 21 in Brussels
Hermann Berens – 50 Piano Pieces for First Beginners, Op.70
Alexander Borodin – Piano Trio in D major
Johannes Brahms 
Variations and Fugue on a Theme by Handel
Variations on a Theme by Robert Schumann, Op.23
Piano Quartet No.1, Op.25
Anton Bruckner
Afferentur regi, WAB 1
Am Grabe, WAB 2
Ave Maria, WAB 6
Du bist wie eine Blume, WAB 64, dated December 5
Fugue in D minor, WAB 125, dated November 8
Antonín Dvořák – String Quintet No. 1 in A minor, Op. 1
Hermann Goetz – Piano Concerto in E-flat
Edvard Grieg – 4 Songs, Op.2
Arthur Sullivan –  The Tempest, premiered April 6 in Leipzig.
Thomas Dyke Acland Tellefsen 
Marche triomphale, Op.29
Grande Valses, Op.30
Piano Trio, Op.31
Henri Vieuxtemps – Violin Concerto No. 5
Robert Volkmann 
Ungarische Skizzen, Op.24
String Quartet No.6, Op.43

Opera
Daniel François Esprit Auber – La Circassienne, premiered February 2 in Paris
Ferenc Erkel – Bánk bán
Stanislaw Moniuszko – Verbum Nobile
Amilcare Ponchielli – La Savoiarda

Musical theater
 Orpheus In The Underworld by Offenbach, New York production

Published Methods and Writings 

 John Curwen – How to Observe Harmony
 John Hullah – The History of Modern Music
 Carl von Ledebur – Tonkünstler-Lexicon Berlin's
 Jean-Joseph Rodolphe – Solfège
 Eugène Sauzay – Haydn, Mozart, Beethoven
 Franz Xaver Schnyder von Wartensee – Aesthetische Betrachtungen über die Schöpfung

Births
February 1 – Emilio Pizzi, composer (died 1940)
February 21 – Pierre de Bréville, composer (d. 1949)
April 7 – Clara Novello Davies, singer, conductor and music teacher (d. 1943)
April 26 – Ferdinand Buescher, instrument manufacturer (d. 1937)
April 27 – Georgy Catoire, composer (died 1926)
May 10 – Francisco Cimadevilla González, guitarist and composer (d. 1931)
May 12 – Ivan Caryll, composer (died 1921)
 May 19 – Nellie Melba, operatic soprano (d. 1931)
June 11 – Sigismund Zaremba, composer (d. 1915)
 June 15 – Ernestine Schumann-Heink, operatic contralto (d. 1936)
June 17 – Sidney Jones, composer of musical comedies (d. 1946)
June 27 – Fanny Davies, pianist (d. 1934)
July 16 – Franz von Blon, composer (died 1945)
 August 11 – Anton Arensky, pianist and composer (d. 1906)
 August 19 – Sadie Martinot, actress and soprano singer (d. 1923)
 September 7 – Thomas Whitney Surette, composer (died 1941)
 November 3 – Thomas O'Brien Butler, composer (died 1915)
 November 19 – Theodor Mannborg, organ maker (died 1930)
 November 29 – Spyridon Samaras, Greek opera composer, who also set to music the Olympic Anthem (d. 1917)
 November 30 – Ludwig Thuille, composer (died 1907)
December 5 – James Thornton, English-born US songwriter and vaudeville comedian (d. 1938)
 December 18 – Lionel Monckton, composer of musical comedies (d. 1924)
date unknown
Camille D'elmar, opera singer (d. 1902)
Giuseppe Fiorini, musical instrument maker (d. 1934)
Ferdinand Ellsworth Olds, instrument manufacturer (d. 1928)

Deaths
January 17 – Lola Montez, dancer (b. 1821)
January 22 – Giovanni Velluti, castrato singer (b. 1780)
February 12 – Hippolyte André Jean Baptiste Chélard, conductor and composer (b. 1789)
February 20 – Eugène Scribe, librettist (b. 1791)
March 14 – Louis Niedermeyer, composer (b. 1802)
May 3 – Anthony Philip Heinrich, composer (b. 1781)
August 9 – Vincent Novello, composer and music publisher (b. 1781)
August 11 – Catherine Hayes, soprano (born c. 1818)
October 24 – Elisabeth Frösslind, opera singer (b. 1793)
December 14 – Heinrich Marschner, composer (b. 1795)
December 16 – Karol Lipiński, violinist and composer (b. 1790)
December 18 – Ernst Anschütz, organist, composer and poet (b. 1780)
December 25 – Natale Abbadia, composer (b. 1792)

References

 
19th century in music
Music by year